Wolfratshausen is a town of the district of Bad Tölz-Wolfratshausen, located in Bavaria, Germany. The town had a population of 19,033 as of 31 December 2019.

History
The first mention of "Wolveradeshusun" appears in documents from the year 1003. About 100 years later, Otto II, the Graf of Deißen-Andechs, built a castle on a hill overlooking the valley. The castle was destroyed on 7 April 1734 when lightning struck the tower where gunpowder was stored. Stones from the ruins were transported to Munich where they were used to build the Residenz.

From 1280 the town was designated a market town. In 1286, Conrad Nantwein, a pilgrim from Northern Germany, was arrested and burned at the stake in Wolfratshausen. Pope Boniface VIII canonized Nantwein as St. Nantovinus in 1297.

By the 15th century, the Loisach and Isar rivers were used for water transport, especially logging. River travel continued and rafts operated between Wolfratshausen and Munich.

During World War II, a forced-labour subcamp of Dachau concentration camp named Föhrenwald was located between Wolfratshausen and Geretsried.   Following the war, the labour camp was used as a displaced persons camp by the Allies. In 1957, Föhrenwald was transformed into a suburb of Wolfratshausen and renamed Waldram, to honour the Lord of Münsing who was one of the founders of the Benediktbeuern Abbey.

In July 1983, Croatian emigre businessman Stjepan Đureković was assassinated by UDBA agents in Wolfratshausen.

Wolfratshausen was formerly the seat of the district government, but this moved to Bad Tölz in 1972.

Geography
Wolfratshausen sits at the confluence of the Isar and Loisach Rivers, at   approx. 30 km (19 mls.) southwest of Munich. A canal joins the two rivers to return water diverted for power generation at the Isar Amper Werke to the Isar. The town covers 9.13 square kilometres and is 577 meters above sea level.

Politics

Mayor 
The current mayor of Wolfratshausen is Klaus Heilinglechner of the Bürgervereinigung Wolfratshausen (BVW), who was elected in 2014 and re-elected in 2020.

City council
The Wolfratshausen city council (Stadtrat) governs the city alongside the Mayor. The most recent city council election was held on 15 March 2020, and the results were as follows:

! colspan=2| Party
! Lead candidate
! Votes
! %
! +/-
! Seats
! +/-
|-
| bgcolor=| 
| align=left| Alliance 90/The Greens (Grüne)
| align=left| Annette Heinloth
| 44,639
| 25.0
|  13.5
| 6
|  3
|-
| bgcolor=| 
| align=left| Christian Social Union (CSU)
| align=left| Günther Eibl
| 39,544
| 22.2
|  10.3
| 5
|  3
|-
| bgcolor=FF8C00|
| align=left| Citizen's union Wolfratshausen (BVW)
| align=left| Klaus Heilinglechner
| 38,965
| 21.8
|  11.8
| 5
|  3
|-
| bgcolor=| 
| align=left| Social Democratic Party (SPD)
| align=left| Manfred Menke
| 25,512
| 14.3
|  8.2
| 4
|  1
|-
| bgcolor=33cccc| 
| align=left| List WOR (Liste WOR)
| align=left| Richard Kugler
| 22,806
| 12.8
| New
| 3
| New
|-
| bgcolor=| 
| align=left| Free Democratic Party (FDP)
| align=left| Patrick Lechner
| 5,354
| 3.0
| New
| 1
| New
|-
| bgcolor=| 
| align=left| Alternative for Germany (AfD)
| align=left| Timo Klitzsch
| 1,562
| 0.9
| New
| 0
| New
|-
! colspan=3| Valid votes
! 8,153
! 97.8
! 
! 
! 
|-
! colspan=3| Invalid votes
! 188
! 2.2
! 
! 
! 
|-
! colspan=3| Total
! 8,341
! 100.0
! 
! 
! ±0
|-
! colspan=3| Electorate/voter turnout
! 14,873
! 56.1
!  2.7
! 
! 
|-
| colspan=8| Source: Votemanager
|}

Town subdivisions

The town of Wolfratshausen is split into the following subdivisions:
 Altstadt
 Weidach
 Nantwein
 Farchet
 Waldram

Notable people 

 St. Nantovinus (d. 1286), Roman Catholic Saint
 Rudolf II, Count Palatine of the Rhine (1306-1353), Palatinate of the Rhine
 Rupert I, Elector Palatine (1309-1390), Palgravegraf of the Rhine and Kurfürst of the Palatinate; founder of the University of Heidelberg which is named after him
 Ernst Wiechert (1887-1950), writer and poet, acquired the Gagerthof in Wolfratshausen in 1936
 Hans Stuck (1900-1978), car racing driver 
 Edmund Stoiber (born 1941), jurist and politician (CSU), Minister President of the Free State of Bavaria from 28 May 1993 to 30 September 2007
 Saul Rubinek (born 1948), Canadian Hollywood actor, director and film producer
 Johanna Hagn (born 1973), German judoka
 Florian Wanner (born 1978), German judoka
 Murat Bosporus (born 1979), German wrestling sportsman
 Markus Janka (born 1980), German ice hockey goalie
 Claudia Lichtenberg (born 1985), German professional cyclist
 Wilhelm Bittrich (1894-1979), SS-Obergruppenfuehrer

Culture, sights, and recreation

Buildings of note 

 Parish Church "St. Andreas" (erected 1484)
 The Humplbräu, a hotel and restaurant in the historic city center (first mentioned in a document in 1619)
 Historic city center (since 2005 with traffic reduction by use of one-way streets)
 The gallery Schwankl-Eck
 The Loisachhalle, a community exhibition and multi-use hall.

Museums 
 Museum of Local History
 Erinnerungsort Badehaus (Remembrance Place Badehaus)

Recreation and travel destinations 

 Amusement park "Märchenwald im Isartal" (opened 1968).
 Log raft rides on the Isar and Loisach to Munich
 Castle: Even if now only a Commemorative plaque and tuff remnants harken to the memory of this castle, its size can still be imagined. In 1734 the castle was destroyed by an explosion resulting from a lightning strike to the ammunition tower.
 A walk through the hillside forest provides views of the entire city and the peaks of the Karwendel and Wetterstein mountain ranges, from the Wendelstein in the east to the Zugspitze in the south.
 Bike riding or rollerblading through the wildlife reserve Isarauen/Pupplinger Au.
 The Japanese garden Yuko Nihon Teien, a gift from the Japanese sister city Iruma.
 Bike ride to Lake Starnberg (about 12.5 miles)
 The Via Bavarica Tyrolensis, a 140-mile bike path from Munich through the Alps to the Inn river Valley, goes through the Pupplinger Au.
 Skiing at the slopes in Peretshofen and Beuerberg.  The larger ski areas can be reached within 1 to 2 hours.
 There are around 125 miles of cross-country ski runs in the surrounding area.

Media 
A police German TV-series "Hubert ohne Staller" (2011–2018: Hubert und Staller) shows the town.

References

External links
 Wolfratshausen website
 Map
 Article in the Economist (Aug 08)

Bad Tölz-Wolfratshausen